The Great Songs of Roy Orbison is an album recorded by Roy Orbison for MGM Records that was released in the United States in February 1970.

Track listing
All tracks composed by Roy Orbison and Bill Dees, except where indicated
Side one
"Breakin' Up Is Breakin' My Heart" (P) 1966
"Cry Softly Lonely One" (Joe Melson, Don Gant) (P) 1967
"Penny Arcade" (Sammy King) (P) 1969
"Ride Away" (P) 1965 
"Southbound Jericho Parkway" (Bobby Bond) (P) 1969

Side two
"Crawling Back" (P) 1965
"Heartache" (P) 1968
"Too Soon to Know" (Don Gibson) (P) 1966
"My Friend" (P) 1966
"Here Comes the Rain, Baby" (Mickey Newbury) (P) 1967

Produced by Wesley Rose and Jim Vienneau
except "My Friend" & "Southbound Jericho Parkway" Produced by Don Gant
Arrangers: Bill McElhiney, Jim Hall, Emory Gordy, Jr., Tupper Saussy

Roy Orbison albums
1970 greatest hits albums
albums produced by Wesley Rose
MGM Records compilation albums